A pirate ship is a type of amusement ride based on pirate ships, consisting of an open, seated gondola (usually in the style of a pirate ship) which swings back and forth, subjecting the rider to various levels of angular momentum. A variant where the riders must pull on ropes to swing the ride is known as a swing boat.

The first known predecessor of the ride was invented by Charles Albert Marshall of Tulsa, Oklahoma between 1893 and 1897. This ride was originally called "The Ocean Wave".

The Ocean Wave was first used in the Marshall Bros Circus in 1897. The circus was run by Charles and his brothers Mike, Will, Ed, friends, and family.

Height requirements 
Height requirements for this type of ride vary from park to park.

Pirate ship rides 

There are a number of Swinging Ship-type rides, and multiple manufacturers.
Chance Rides' original version is known as the Sea Dragon which are permanent or two trailer portable models. The later version is known as "Pharaoh's Fury" and could be permanent or transported on one 53-foot trailer. 
Fabbri's version is known as the Pirate Ship, and can hold 40 passengers.
HUSS' version is known as the Pirate Boat, and can hold up to 54 passengers in 9 rows.
Intamin version is called Bounty.
Mulligan's version is known as the Sea Ray.
SBF Visa's version is known as Pirate and can accommodate 32 passengers.
SDC makes a version called the Pirate Ship.
Zamperla's version is known as the Galleon, and has four sizes available, which can hold 33, 42, 54 or 84 passengers.
Zierer's version is known as the Viking Ship and can accommodate 40 passengers.
Metallbau Emmeln's version is known as the Schiffsschaukeln and can accommodate 24/40 passengers.
Helmut Hauser
DAL Amusements
Staudenmeyer & Weidmann's version was most iconic from Wicksteed Park's double pirate ship.

Variants 
 The Looping Starship, manufactured by Intamin is similar to a pirate ship, except that goes upside down. This gives the rider a feel of zero gravity for a moment as it swings back down while making 360° loops.

 Manufactured by Anton Schwarzkopf, the Shuttle Boat is a pirate ship ride which instead of swinging back and forth rides on a half pipe track. This idea would later be adopted by Zamperla and turned into the Rockin' Tug, featuring a ship that rotates about its own axis also.

 Some traveling fairs in Europe have pirate ships in which the riders can choose to stand up in cages located at the ends of the ships. These do not go upside down, but do swing to a horizontal position.
The names listed are given by the manufacturers, and individual parks may change the name of the ride itself.  Many parks use a Viking Ship theme for their ride. Smaller versions of the ride are often called "Swingboats".

Appearances

 Anchor's Away: Enchanted Kingdom
 Barco Pirata: Pola Park
 Bateau Pirate: La Ronde
 Bateau pirate: Le Pal
 Berserker Kings Dominion
 The Battering Ram: Busch Gardens Williamsburg
 Bluebeard's Bounty: Kentucky Kingdom	
 The Blade: Alton Towers
 Blue Barnacle: Chessington World of Adventures
 The Bounty: Drayton Manor
 Bounty: Heide Park
 Buccaneer: Six Flags Great Adventure, Six Flags Magic Mountain
 Caribbean Boat: Walygator Parc
 Conquistador: Six Flags Over Texas, Lotte World
 Crazy Galleon: Ocean Park Hong Kong
 Drageskibet: Djurs Sommerland
 Dragon Swing: Knott's Berry Farm
 Flying Cutlass: Lightwater Valley
 Flying Galleon: Galaxyland
 Galion Pirate: Nigloland
 Galleon: Knoebels
Galleon: Adventureland (Iowa)
Galleon: Alabama Splash Adventure
Ghostly Galleon: Adventure Wonderland
 Halve Maen: Efteling
 High Seas: Six Flags America
 The Hook: Lihpao Land
 Jolly Rocker: Legoland Windsor
 Journey to Zanzibar: Columbus Zoo
 Kontiki: PortAventura Park
 Mayflower: Holiday World & Splashin' Safari
 Mr Monkey's Banana Ride: Thorpe Park
 Navío Barbarroja: Isla Mágica
 Ocean Motion: Calaway Park
 Ocean Motion: Cedar Point
 Pharaoh's Fury: Casino Pier, DelGrosso's Amusement Park, Kemah Boardwalk, Wild Adventures, Keansburg Amusement Park (Keansburg, New Jersey), Old Town Kissimmee
 Pirata: Canobie Lake Park
 Pirate: Darien Lake, Lake Winnepesaukah, Playland (Vancouver B.C.), Hersheypark
 Pirate: Kennywood
 Pirate Ship: Adventureland (New York), Lake Compounce, Nicolândia Center Park, Rainbow's End, Santa Cruz Beach Boardwalk, Wonderland Park (Texas), Bottons Pleasure Beach, Skegness, Great Yarmouth Pleasure Beach
 Piratenboot: Bellewaerde
 Piratta: Tibidabo Amusement Park
 Prairie Schooner: Frontier City
 RipTide (formerly Sea Dragon): Morey's Piers
 Rum Runner: Magic Springs and Crystal Falls
 Sand Pirates: Adventuredome
 Sea Dragon: Clementon Park, Dorney Park & Wildwater Kingdom, Funland (Rehoboth Beach, Delaware), Michigan's Adventure, Santa's Village AZoosment Park, Waldameer Park, Worlds of Fun, Galveston Island Historic Pleasure Pier, Pacific Park, Castles N' Coasters, Elitch Gardens, Indiana Beach, Niagara Amusement Park & Splash World
 Sea Swell: Lost Island Theme Park
 Smiles Per Galleon: Adventure Island
 The Swinging Viking: Motiongate Dubai
 Tidal Wave: Lagoon Amusement Park
 Viikinkilaiva: Linnanmäki
 Viikinkilaiva: Särkänniemi
 Viking: Star City
 Viking Fury: Kings Island
 Viking's Rage: Canada's Wonderland
 Vindjammer: Europa-Park

Former appearances
 "Buccaneer": Geauga Lake
 "Canoa Krakatoa": Six Flags México
 "The Galleon": Camelot Theme Park
 "Galleon": Santa's Village AZoosment Park and Bowcraft Amusement Park
 "The Ocean Wave": Olentangy Park
 "Pirate": Alabama Adventure
 "Pirate Ship": Astroland, Sea World The Great Escape
 "Sea Dragon": Morey's Piers (closed because the mast broke off the ride), Ghost Town in the Sky in Maggie Valley, NC and Indiana Beach, DelGrosso's Amusement Park
 "Sea Ray": Martin's Fantasy Island
 "Sturmschiff": Holiday Park
 "The Galleon": Kiddieland Amusement Park
 "Bounty's Revenge": Adventure World in Perth
 Black Buccaneer: Chessington World Of Adventures

References

External links 

Chance Morgan
Fabbri Group
Intamin
SDC Rides
Zamperla
HUSS
Double Pirate Ship Ride by Kallenkoop

Pendulum rides
Pirates in popular culture